Aisea Turuva Tuidraki (born 3 February 1916 at Saunaka, Nadi; died 1966 at Nukulau, Fiji) was a Fijian cricketer.

Tuidraki made his first-class debut for Fiji in 1948 against Wellington during Fiji's 1947/48 tour of New Zealand. He played one other first-class match during the tour against Auckland. In his two first-class matches for Fiji he scored 53 runs at a batting average of 13.25, with a high score of 23. In the field Tuidraki took four catches. He played six non-first-class matches for Fiji on their 1947/48 tour, with his final match coming against Bay of Plenty.

Tuidraki died in 1966 at Nukulau, Fiji.

External links
Aisea Tuidraki at Cricinfo
Aisea Tuidraki at CricketArchive

1916 births
1966 deaths
Sportspeople from Nadi
Fijian cricketers